Hestetun is a Norwegian surname. Notable people with the surname include:

Anne Valen Hestetun (1920–2009), Norwegian politician
Per Klingenberg Hestetun (1877–1928), Norwegian politician

Norwegian-language surnames